Freedom to Learn (FTL) is a statewide education program in Michigan helping schools create high performing, student-centered learning environments by providing each student and teacher with direct, consistent access to 21st century learning tools.

The program was started in 2002 when the Michigan Legislature and governor dedicated state and federal (Title II, D) funds to a Demonstration Phase. Seeing the positive early results, the state expanded the program in 2004. Michigan has allocated over $30 million in federal and state funds to include over 23,000 students in 100 school districts and 191 buildings - primarily middle schools.

 Freedom to learn is also "the freedom of the learning generation." There was a great thinker, Leo Tolstoy, and he wrote:

Primary goals of FTL
Enhance student learning and achievement in core academic subjects with an emphasis on developing the knowledge and skills requisite to the establishment of a 21st-century workforce in Michigan.
Provide greater access to equal educational opportunities statewide through ubiquitous access to technology.
Foster effective use of the wireless technology through systematic professional development for teachers, administrators and staff.
Empower parents and caregivers with the tools to become more involved in their child's education.
Support innovative structural changes in participating schools and sharing of best practices among Program participants.

FTL offers the training and resources necessary to transform schools—and it is doing just that.  A rigorous and comprehensive evaluation is gauging the impact of the program to assemble lessons learned and best practices – early results are available on the Freedom to Learn website.

The goals of education in a free society

 The ability to function in a free, democratic society as full participants in community affairs; a society where every citizen, regardless of age, color, religion, or belief, shows full respect for everyone else, treating all people as equals in all matters.
 The ability to think creatively and meet new challenges as they come up.
 Child's development into a responsible adult in the community.
 To be flexible in their [the children's] thinking, to be confident in their ability to make decisions and above all to feel responsible for their own lives as well as for their own communities.

See also

 Sudbury Model of democratic schools

References

External links
 Freedom to Learn homepage
 Hale to the Program 
 Students Taking Charge 
 The Missing Link
 Sudbury Valley School homepage

Education in Michigan